Collins Creek may refer to:

Collins Creek (Idaho), a stream in Idaho
Collins Creek (Haw River tributary), a stream in Chatham and Orange Counties, North Carolina
Collins Creek (Pennsylvania), a stream in Pennsylvania
Collins Creek (Kentucky), a tributary of Goose Creek